Manylovsky Pogost is a rural locality (a village) in Tolshmenskoye Rural Settlement, Totemsky District, Vologda Oblast, Russia. The population was 43 as of 2002.

Geography 
Manylovsky Pogost is located 74 km southwest of Totma (the district's administrative centre) by road. Manylovo is the nearest rural locality.

References 

Rural localities in Tarnogsky District